FBO may refer to:

 Film Booking Offices of America, a former American film studio
 Fixed-base operator, provider of ground services to general aviation at an airport
 Forest beat officer, subordinate of a Forest Range Officer in India

 Foxtel Box Office, an Australian pay-per-view television channel
Faith-based organization
 Framebuffer object, an architectural element of OpenGL image processing
 Office of Foreign Building Operations, now the Bureau of Overseas Buildings Operations, in the United States Department of State
 Chemical formula for Boron monofluoride monoxide